Oncopera alpina is a moth of the family Hepialidae. It is found in the Australian Capital Territory,
New South Wales and Victoria.

The larvae are subterranean and feed on roots and bases of snow grasses (Poa species).

References

Moths described in 1933
Hepialidae